Bolade is a Nigerian given name. Notable people with the name include:

 Bolade Ajomale (born 1995), Canadian sprinter
 Nitanju Bolade Casel, African-American singer

Nigerian feminine given names